Vodun (meaning spirit in the Fon, Gun and Ewe languages,  with a nasal high-tone u; also spelled Vodon, Vodoun, Vodou, Vudu, Voudou, Voodoo, etc.) is a religion practiced by the Aja, Ewe, and Fon peoples of Benin, Togo, Ghana, and Nigeria.
 
Elements of the West African religion have survived slavery and evolved into the current forms of religions with similar names that are found in the New World among the African diaspora in the Americas, such as Haitian Vodou; Louisiana Voodoo; Cuban Vodú; Dominican Vudú, Venezuelan Yuyu, and Brazilian Vodum (Candomblé Jejé and Tambor de Mina).

Theology and practice

Vodun cosmology centers around the vodun spirits and other elements of divine essence that govern the Earth, a hierarchy that range in power from major deities governing the forces of nature and human society to the spirits of individual streams, trees, and rocks, as well as dozens of ethnic vodun, defenders of a certain clan, tribe, or nation. The vodun are the center of religious life. Perceived similarities with Roman Catholic doctrines such as the intercession of saints and angels allowed Vodun to appear compatible with Catholicism, and helped produce syncretic religions such as Haitian Vodou. Adherents also emphasize ancestor worship and hold that the spirits of the dead live side by side with the world of the living, each family of spirits having its own female priesthood, sometimes hereditary when it is from mother to blood daughter. There is also an underlying philosophical framing underpinning Vodun which, according to Suzanne Preston Blier, who undertook a year of research in 1985–86 in Abomey and the nearby area, highlights the importance of remaining calm in contexts of difficulty and in life more generally. According to Suzanne Preston Blier, Vodun means, “the idea of staying close to a water source, to not rush through life, to take time to attain tranquility.” Her interpretation stems from two area diviners who maintain that its origins lie in the phrase “rest to draw the water,” from the Fon verbs vo “to rest,” and dun “to draw water,” the stoic suggestion of “the need for one to be calm and composed” in the face of adversity.

Patterns of Vodun worship follow various dialects, spirits, practices, songs, and rituals. The divine Creator, called variously Mawu or Mahu, is a female being. She is an elder woman, and usually a mother who is gentle and forgiving. She is also seen as the god who owns all other gods and even if there is no temple made in her name, the people continue to pray to her, especially in times of distress. In one tradition, she bore seven children. Sakpata: Vodun of the Earth, Xêvioso (or Xêbioso): Vodun of Thunder, also associated with Divine Justice, Agbe: Vodun of the Sea, Gû: Vodun of Iron and War, Agê: Vodun of Agriculture and Forests, Jo: Vodun of Air, and Lêgba: Vodun of the Unpredictable.

The Creator embodies a dual cosmogonic principle of which Mawu the moon and Lisa the sun are respectively the female and male aspects, often portrayed as the twin children of the Creator. Lisa is the sun god who brings the day and the heat, and also strength and energy. Mawu, the moon goddess, provides the cool of the night, peace, fertility, and rain. To give this in a summed aspect, a proverb says ‘When Lisa punishes Mawu forgives.

Legba is often represented as a phallus or as a man with a prominent phallus. Known as the youngest son of Mawu, he is the chief of all Vodun divinities; in his Diasporic portrayal, Legba is believed to be a very old man who walks on crutches. Being old he is seen as wise, but when seen as a child he is one who is rebellious. It is only through contact with Legba that it becomes possible to contact the other gods, for he is the guardian at the door of the spirits. Dan, who is Mawu's androgynous son, is represented as a rainbow serpent, and was to remain with her and act as a go-between with her other creations. As the mediator between the spirits and the living, Dan maintains balance, order, peace and communication.

All creation is considered divine and therefore contains the power of the divine. This is how medicines such as herbal remedies are understood, and explains the ubiquitous use of mundane objects in religious ritual. Vodun talismans, called "fetishes", are objects such as statues or dried animal or human parts that are sold for their healing and spiritually rejuvenating properties. Specifically, they are objects inhabited by spirits. The entities that inhabit a fetish are able to perform different tasks according to their stage of development. Fetish objects are often combined in the construction of "shrines", used to call forth specific vodun and their associated powers.

Priestess

The Queen Mother is the first daughter of a matriarchal lineage of a family collective. She holds the right to lead the ceremonies incumbent to the clan: marriages, baptisms and funerals. She is one of the most important members of community. She will lead the women of a village when her family collective is the ruling one. They take part in the organisation and the running of markets and are also responsible for their upkeep. This is vitally important because marketplaces are the focal points for gatherings and social centres in their communities. In the past when the men of the villages would go to war, the Queen Mothers would lead prayer ceremonies in which all the women attended every morning to ensure the safe return of their menfolk.

The high priestess is the woman chosen by the oracle to care for the convent. Priestesses, like priests, receive a calling from an oracle, which may come at any moment during their lives. They will then join their clan's convent to pursue spiritual instruction. It is also an oracle that will designate the future high priest and high priestess among the new recruits, establishing an order of succession within the convent. Only blood relatives were allowed in the family convent; strangers are forbidden.
In modern days, however, some family members enter what is described as the first circle of worship. Strangers are allowed to worship only the spirits of the standard pantheon.

Demographics
About 17% of the population of Benin, some 1.6 million people, follow Vodun. (This does not count other traditional religions in Benin.) In addition, many of the 41.5% of the population that refer to themselves as "Christian" practice a syncretized religion, not dissimilar from Haitian Vodou or Brazilian Candomblé; indeed, many of them are descended from freed Brazilian slaves who settled on the coast near Ouidah.

In Togo, about half the population practices indigenous religions, of which Vodun is by far the largest, with some 2.5 million followers; there may be another million Vodunists among the Ewe of Ghana, as a 13% of the total Ghana population of 20 million are Ewe and 38% of Ghanaians practice traditional religion. According to census data, about 14 million people practice traditional religion in Nigeria, most of whom are Yoruba practicing Ifá, but no specific breakdown is available.

European colonialism, followed by some of the totalitarian regimes in West Africa, have tried to suppress Vodun as well as other traditional religions. However, because the Vodun deities are born to each clan, tribe, and nation, and their clergy are central to maintaining the moral, social and political order and ancestral foundation of its village, these efforts have not been successful. Recently there have been moves to restore the place of Vodun in national society, such as an annual International Vodun Conference that has been held in the city of Ouidah, Benin since 1991.

Art

Gallery

See also

 African-American religion
 Akan religion
 Candomble jeje
 Dahomean religion
 Haitian mythology
 Haitian Vodou art
 Hoodoo
 Juju
 Louisiana Voodoo
 Odinani
 Tambor de Mina
 Vodun art
 West African mythology
 Witch doctor
 Yoruba religion
 Witchcraft

References

Further reading

 Ajayi, J.F. and Espie, I. "Thousand Years of West African History" (Ibadan: Ibadan University Press, 1967).
 Akyea, O.E. "Ewe." New York: (The Rosen Group, 1988).
 Ayivi Gam l . Togo Destination. High Commissioner for Tourism. Republic of Togo, 1982.
 Bastide. R. African Civilizations in the New World. New York: Harper Torchbooks, 1971.
 Decalo, Samuel. "Historical Dictionary of Dahomey" (Metuchen, N.J: The Scarecrow Press, 1976).
 Deren, Maya. "Divine Horsemen: The Living Gods of Haiti." (London: Thames and Hudson, 1953).
 "Demoniacal Possession in Angola, Africa". Journal of American Folk-lore. Vol VI., 1893. No. XXIII.
 Ellis, A.B. "Ewe-Speaking Peoples of the Slave Coast of West Africa" (Chicago: Benin Press, 1965).
 Fontenot, Wonda. L. "Secret Doctors: Enthnomedicine of African Americans" (Westport: Bergin & Garvey, 1994).
 Hazoum ‚ P. "Doguicimi. The First Dahomean Novel" (Washington, DC: Three Continents Press, 1990).
 Herskovits, M.J. and Hersovits, F.S. Dahomey: An Ancient West African Kingdom. Evanston, IL: Northwestern University,
 Hindrew, Vivian M.Ed., Mami Wata: African's Ancient God/dess Unveiled. Reclaiming the Ancient Vodoun heritage of the Diaspora. Martinez, GA: MWHS.
 Hindrew, Vivian M.Ed., Vodoun: Why African-Americans Fear Their Cosmogentic Paths to God. Martinez, GA. MWHS:
 Herskovits, M.J. and Hersovits, F.S. "An Outline of Dahomean Religious Belief" (Wisconsin: The American Anthropological Association, 1933).
 Hurston, Zora Neale. "Tell My Horse: Voodoo And Life In Haiti And Jamaica." Harper Perennial reprint edition, 1990.
 Hyatt M. H. "Hoodoo-Conjuration-Witchcraft-Rootwork" (Illinois: Alama Egan Hyatt Foundation, 1973), Vols. I-V.
 Journal of African History. 36. (1995) pp. 391–417.Concerning Negro Sorcery in the United States;
 Language Guide (Ewe version). Accra: Bureau of Ghana Languages,
 Maupoil, Bernard. "La Geomancie L'ancienne des Esclaves" (Paris: L'université de Paris, 1943).
 Metraux, Alfred. "Voodoo In Haiti." (Pantheon reprint edition, 1989)
 Newbell, Pucket. N. "Folk Beliefs of the Southern Negro". S.C.: Chapel Hill, 1922.
 Newell, William, W. "Reports of Voodoo Worship in Hayti and Louisiana," Journal of American Folk-lore, 41–47, 1888. p. 41-47.
 Barreiro, Daniel, Garcia, Diego. "Nuit: una vision de la continuidad ancestral (spanish edition)". Montevideo, Uruguay, 2014
 Pliya, J. "Histoire Dahomey Afrique Occidental" (Moulineaux: France, 1970).
 Slave Society on the Southern Plantation''. The Journal of Negro History. Vol. VII-January, 1922-No.1.

External links

 Traditional Religion in Africa:The Vodun Phenomenon in Benin
 Vodou-related Rara festivals in Haiti and New York 
 Voodoo and West Africa's Spiritual Life
 Vodun in Africa 
Spanish police pull pin on voodoo sex slave ring The Local, 2013
For those who fight sex-trafficking, dark rituals compound the problem The Economist, 2018

 
Kingdom of Dahomey
Religion in Benin
Religion in Ghana
Religion in Nigeria
Religion in Togo